Aphonopelma is a genus of tarantulas native to the Americas. It includes nearly all the North American tarantula species north of Mexico and a considerable percentage of the tarantula species that range into Central America. Most are fairly large tarantulas with leg spans of 6 in (16 cm) or more. Like most New World tarantulas, all species of Aphonopelma have urticating hairs. Despite their fearsome appearance, these tarantulas are not harmful to humans and some species are popular in the pet trade. With about 90 species described so far, Aphonopelma comprises about 10% of the total number of described tarantula species. However, their taxonomy is poorly understood and species are difficult to tell apart, especially those that are brown or black without other pattern. Therefore, the actual number of species is unknown, with more species likely to be identified in the near future. In captivity, they are usually fed crickets; in the wild, they eat most insects, including crickets, grasshoppers, cockroaches, mantises, and beetles.

Taxonomy
The genus has a complicated taxonomic history. It was erected in 1901 by Reginald I. Pocock, when he split up Eurypelma (now Avicularia), with the type species Eurypelma seemanni. Pocock also separated off the genus Dugesiella. Two more new genera were later distinguished from Aphonopelma: Delopelma by Alexander Petrunkevitch in 1939 and Chaunopelma by Joseph C. Chamberlin in 1940. In 1985, Robert J. Raven reviewed mygalomorph genera and considered the differences among all these genera to be insignificant. He synonymized them under the name Rhechostica, which had been published by Eugène Simon in 1892, so had priority. Since the name Aphonopelma was much better known than Rechostica, the International Commission on Zoological Nomenclature in 1991 agreed to give Aphonopelma precedence over Rhechostica. In 1995, Smith erected the genus Apachepelma for the species A. paloma; in 1997, Prentice transferred it back to Aphonopelma.

Phylogeny
Molecular phylogenetic studies suggest that the genus is not monophyletic. Two groups of species are apparent: one from Central America, including the type species A. seemanni from Costa Rica, and another made up of species found in the United States. The relationship between the two groups and the genus Sericopelma is shown in the cladogram below. With further research, a new genus may be needed for the American group of species.

Species
, the World Spider Catalog accepted 54 species. A monograph of the genus within the United States, published in 2016, made some major revisions. Only 15 of the original 55 U.S. species were fully accepted, 33 were reduced to synonyms, and seven to nomina dubia (doubtful names). A further 14 new U.S. species were then described.

Aphonopelma anax (Chamberlin, 1940) – United States, Mexico
Aphonopelma armada (Chamberlin, 1940) – United States
Aphonopelma atomicum Hamilton, 2016 – United States
Aphonopelma bacadehuachi Hendrixson, 2019 – Mexico
Aphonopelma belindae Gabriel, 2011 – Panama
Aphonopelma bicoloratum Struchen, Brändle & Schmidt, 1996 – Mexico
Aphonopelma burica Valerio, 1980 – Costa Rica
Aphonopelma caniceps (Simon, 1891) – Mexico
Aphonopelma catalina Hamilton, Hendrixson & Bond, 2016 – United States
Aphonopelma chalcodes Chamberlin, 1940 – United States
Aphonopelma chiricahua Hamilton, Hendrixson & Bond, 2016 – United States
Aphonopelma cookei Smith, 1995 – Mexico
Aphonopelma crinirufum (Valerio, 1980) – Costa Rica
Aphonopelma eustathes (Chamberlin, 1940) – Mexico
Aphonopelma eutylenum Chamberlin, 1940 – United States
Aphonopelma gabeli Smith, 1995 – United States
Aphonopelma geotoma (Chamberlin, 1937) – Mexico
Aphonopelma gertschi Smith, 1995 – Mexico
Aphonopelma griseum Chamberlin, 1940 – Mexico
Aphonopelma hageni (Strand, 1906) – Mexico
Aphonopelma helluo (Simon, 1891) – Mexico
Aphonopelma hentzi (Girard, 1852) – United States
Aphonopelma hesperum (Chamberlin, 1917) – Mexico
Aphonopelma icenoglei Hamilton, Hendrixson & Bond, 2016 – United States
Aphonopelma iodius (Chamberlin & Ivie, 1939) – United States
Aphonopelma johnnycashi Hamilton, 2016 – United States
Aphonopelma joshua Prentice, 1997 – United States
Aphonopelma levii Smith, 1995 – Mexico
Aphonopelma madera Hamilton, Hendrixson & Bond, 2016 – United States
Aphonopelma mareki Hamilton, Hendrixson & Bond, 2016 – United States
Aphonopelma marxi (Simon, 1891) – United States
Aphonopelma moderatum (Chamberlin & Ivie, 1939) – United States
Aphonopelma moellendorfi Hamilton, 2016 – United States
Aphonopelma mojave Prentice, 1997 – United States
Aphonopelma mooreae Smith, 1995 – Mexico
Aphonopelma nayaritum Chamberlin, 1940 – Mexico
Aphonopelma pallidum (F. O. Pickard-Cambridge, 1897) – Mexico
Aphonopelma paloma Prentice, 1993 – United States
Aphonopelma parvum Hamilton, Hendrixson & Bond, 2016 – United States
Aphonopelma peloncillo Hamilton, Hendrixson & Bond, 2016 – United States
Aphonopelma phasmus Chamberlin, 1940 – United States
Aphonopelma platnicki Smith, 1995 – Mexico
Aphonopelma prenticei Hamilton, Hendrixson & Bond, 2016 – United States
Aphonopelma prosoicum Chamberlin, 1940 – Mexico
Aphonopelma ruedanum Chamberlin, 1940 – Mexico
Aphonopelma saguaro Hamilton, 2016 – United States
Aphonopelma sclerothrix (Valerio, 1980) – Costa Rica
Aphonopelma seemanni (F. O. Pickard-Cambridge, 1897) (type species) – Central America
Aphonopelma steindachneri (Ausserer, 1875) – United States
Aphonopelma superstitionense Hamilton, Hendrixson & Bond, 2016 – United States
Aphonopelma truncatum (F. O. Pickard-Cambridge, 1897) – Mexico
Aphonopelma vorhiesi (Chamberlin & Ivie, 1939) – United States
Aphonopelma xanthochromum (Valerio, 1980) – Costa Rica
Aphonopelma xwalxwal Hamilton, 2016 – United States

In synonymy

Nomina dubia

Species transferred to other genera

Species names rejected in the 2016 monograph include 

Aphonopelma apacheum Chamberlin, 1940 = A. chalcodes
Aphonopelma arnoldi Smith, 1995 = A. armada
Aphonopelma baergi Chamberlin, 1940, nom. dub.
Aphonopelma behlei Chamberlin, 1940  = A. marxi
Aphonopelma breenei Smith, 1995  = A. anax
Aphonopelma brunnius Chamberlin, 1940  = A. iodius
Aphonopelma chambersi Smith, 1995 = A. eutylenum
Aphonopelma chamberlini Smith, 1995 = A. iodius
Aphonopelma clarki Smith, 1995 = A. hentzi
Aphonopelma clarum Chamberlin, 1940  = A. eutylenum
Aphonopelma coloradanum (Chamberlin, 1940) = A. hentzi
Aphonopelma cratium Chamberlin, 1940, nom. dub.
Aphonopelma cryptethum Chamberlin, 1940 = A. eutylenum
Aphonopelma echinum (Chamberlin, 1940) = A. hentzi
Aphonopelma gurleyi Smith, 1995 = A. hentzi
Aphonopelma harlingenum (Chamberlin, 1940) = A. hentzi
Aphonopelma heterops Chamberlin, 1940 = A. moderatum
Aphonopelma iviei Smith, 1995 = A. iodius
Aphonopelma jungi Smith, 1995 = A. vorhiesi
Aphonopelma lithodomum Chamberlin, 1940 = A. iodius
Aphonopelma minchi Smith, 1995 = A. chalcodes
Aphonopelma mordax (Ausserer, 1871), nom. dub.
Aphonopelma odelli Smith, 1995  = A. hentzi
Aphonopelma phanum Chamberlin, 1940 = A. steindachneri
Aphonopelma punzoi Smith, 1995 = A. vorhiesi 
Aphonopelma radinum (Chamberlin & Ivie, 1939), nom. dub.
Aphonopelma reversum Chamberlin, 1940 = A. steindachneri
Aphonopelma rothi Smith, 1995 = A. chalcodes
Aphonopelma rusticum (Simon, 1891), nom. dub.
Aphonopelma sandersoni Smith, 1995 = A. eutylenum
Aphonopelma schmidti Smith, 1995 = A. chalcodes
Aphonopelma smithi Smith, 1995 = A. iodius
Aphonopelma stahnkei Smith, 1995 = A. chalcodes
Aphonopelma texense (Simon, 1891), nom. dub.
Aphonopelma vogelae Smith, 1995 = A. marxi
Aphonopelma waconum (Chamberlin, 1940) = A. hentzi
Aphonopelma wichitanum (Chamberlin, 1940) = A. hentzi
Aphonopelma zionis Chamberlin, 1940 = A. iodius

References

External links

 
Spiders of North America
Spiders of Central America
Theraphosidae genera
Taxa named by R. I. Pocock